The Black Hills Pioneer (first published as the Black Hills Weekly Pioneer) is a daily newspaper published in Spearfish, South Dakota. Founded by A. W. Merrick and W. A. Laughlin, it was the first newspaper in Deadwood, located in what was then Dakota Territory.

The Black Hills Pioneer is the flagship publication of Seaton Publishing Company, Inc. South Dakota. It is part of a family owned newspaper and digital media company providing local journalism to western South Dakota. It is the official newspaper for Lawrence County, Meade County, and Butte County, including the towns of Spearfish, Lead, Deadwood, Whitewood, Sturgis, Vale, Newell, Nisland, and Belle Fourche, reaching nearly 5,000 subscribers Monday–Saturday.

In addition, Seaton publishes The Nation's Center News, the official weekly newspaper for Harding County, including the communities of Buffalo and Camp Crook, with over 1,200 subscribers.

This group also publishes The Weekly Prospector, a free weekly ad shopper publication. Over 23,000 copies of The Prospector are carrier delivered, direct-mailed, and in newsstands in Lawrence, Meade, Butte, and Harding counties in South Dakota, northeast Wyoming and southeast Montana.

Merrick and the Black Hills Weekly Pioneer are portrayed in the HBO television series Deadwood.

References

External links
Official website

Newspapers published in South Dakota
Black Hills
Publications established in 1876
1876 establishments in Dakota Territory
Spearfish, South Dakota